William Finch (died 1613) was an English merchant in the service of the East India Company (EIC). He travelled to India along with Captain Hawkins during the reign of the Mughal emperor Jehangir. The two of them attended on the emperor at the Mughal court and established trade relations between England and India. Finch subsequently explored various cities in India and left a valuable account of them in his journal, which was subsequently published.

Career
Finch was a native of London. He was agent to an expedition sent by the East India Company, under Captains Hawkins and Keeling, in 1607 to treat with the Great Mogul. Hawkins and Finch landed at Surat on 24 August 1608. They were violently opposed by the Portuguese. Finch, however, obtained permission from the governor of Cambay to dispose of the goods in their vessels. Incited by the Portuguese, who seized two of the English ships, the natives refused to have dealings with the company's representatives. During these squabbles Finch fell ill, and Hawkins, proceeding to Agra alone, obtained favourable notice from the Emperor Jehangir. Finch recovered, and joined Hawkins at Agra on 14 April 1610. The two remained at the mogul's court for about a year and a half. Finch refused tempting offers to attach himself permanently to the service of Jehangir.

Hawkins returned to England, but Finch delayed his departure in order to make further explorations, visiting Byana and Lahore among other places. Finch made careful observations on the commerce and natural products of the districts visited. In 1612 the Moghul emperor confirmed and extended the privileges he had promised to Finch and Hawkins, and the East India Company in that year set up their first little factory at Surat.

Exploration 
Finch explored various cities in India, including Delhi, Ambala, Sultanpur, Ayodhya and Lahore, and left valuable accounts of these places in his diary. He intended to return to Europe overland, but died en route in Baghdad in 1612 probably due to infected water. His belongings were saved and returned to the East India Company. Reverend Samuel Purchas found Finch's journal in the archives of the company and published an abridged version of it as a chapter in his "Pilgrimes".

In Ayodhya, Finch was an early witness to the location of Ramkot ("Rama's fort"), the site of the present day Ayodhya dispute. Finch did not describe a birthplace or mention a mosque in the area. He did mention ruins that were thought to be Rama's castle and houses. The castle was four hundred years old, according to Finch. Regarding the "houses", Finch wrote:

Scholar Hans T. Bakker, who made a detailed study of Ayodhya, takes Finch's account to be an authentic record of the state of the Ramkot area at that time.

Notes

References

Bibliography
 
 
 

Year of birth missing
1613 deaths
16th-century births
Deaths by poisoning
16th-century English businesspeople
17th-century English businesspeople
Merchants from London
Explorers of India
Explorers of Ayodhya